Vasilyevka is a rural locality (a village) in Zilairsky Selsoviet, Zilairsky District, Bashkortostan, Russia. The population was 66 as of 2010. There are 3 streets.

Geography 
Vasilyevka is located 22 km southeast of Zilair (the district's administrative centre) by road. Vladimiro-Nikolayevsky is the nearest rural locality.

References 

Rural localities in Zilairsky District